Hedwig or Jadwiga Jagiellon(ka) may refer to:

 Hedwig Jagiellon (1408–1431), daughter of Jogaila, King of Poland and Grand Duke of Lithuania, and Anna of Celje
 Hedwig Jagiellon (1457–1502), daughter of King Casimir IV Jagiellon of Poland and Archduchess Elisabeth of Austria; wife of Duke George of Bavaria in Landshut
 Hedwig Jagiellon (1513–1573), daughter of Sigismund I the Old of Poland and Hungarian princess Barbara Zápolya; wife of Joachim II Hector, Elector of Brandenburg

Polish feminine given names